Agathistoma viridulum is a species of sea snail, a marine gastropod mollusk in the family Tegulidae.

Description
The size of the shell varies between 13 mm and 30 mm. The solid, umbilicate shell has a conoida shape. Its color is whitish-grayish or greenish, radiately striped above with crimson or rich brown, beneath spotted or radiately striped with the same color. The short spire is rather obtuse. The six whorls are convex, encircled by spiral lirae which are more or less beaded upon the upper surface, the interstices between them minutely spirally striated. On the penultimate whorl they number about six. Below the periphery the lirae are finer, closer, and nearly smooth. The body whorl is obtusely angulate or rounded at the periphery. The base of the shell is rather flattened, somewhat concave around the umbilicus, and generally eroded in front of the aperture. The aperture is oblique. The outer lip beveled to an acute edge, which is usually margined with green and is sulcated or crenulated, the furrows corresponding to the lirae of the outer surface. The pearly throat is also more or less sulcate. The arcuate columella is expanded above in a bright green callus which partly surrounds the umbilicus, at its base green, bearing a tubercular tooth, followed by several smaller ones. The basal margin is smooth or denticulate within. The umbilicus is wide and deep, white or greenish within.

Distribution
This species occurs in the Caribbean Sea off Colombia, Costa Rica, Panama and Venezuela; in the Atlantic of Brazil.

References
Notes

Bibliography
 Williams S.T., Karube S. & Ozawa T. (2008) Molecular systematics of Vetigastropoda: Trochidae, Turbinidae and Trochoidea redefined. Zoologica Scripta 37: 483–506.

External links
 
  Gmelin J.F. (1791). Vermes. In: Gmelin J.F. (Ed.) Caroli a Linnaei Systema Naturae per Regna Tria Naturae, Ed. 13. Tome 1(6). G.E. Beer, Lipsiae
 Wood, W. (1828). Supplement to the Index Testaceologicus; or A catalogue of Shells, British and Foreign. Richard Taylor, London. Iv [+1 + 59 pp., plates 1-8]
  Dornellas, A. P.; Graboski, R. M.; Hellberg, M. E.; Lotufo, T. M. C. (2021). Phylogeography of Agathistoma (Turbinidae, Tegulinae) snails in tropical and southwestern Atlantic. Zoologica Scripta. DOI: 10.1111/zsc.12517

viridulum
Gastropods described in 1791